The Azienda Trasporti Milanesi (ATM) is the municipal public transport company of Milan and 46 surrounding metropolitan municipalities. It operates 5 metro lines (see Milan Metro), 17 tram lines (see Trams in Milan), 121 bus lines and 4 trolleybus lines (see Trolleybuses in Milan), carrying about 776 million passengers in 2018.

ATM manages other minor transport services in Lombardy as well. These include Radiobus, a demand-responsive minibus service; the Cascina Gobba–San Raffaele people mover; the Como–Brunate funicular; the BikeMi bike sharing service. Furthermore, since 2008, it has been operating the Copenhagen Metro in Denmark.

History

Public transport in Milan started on August 17, 1840, with the opening of the Milan-Monza railway. Horse-drawn buses were introduced in 1841.
Services were run by the Società Anonima degli Omnibus (SAO), "Omnibus Anonymous Company". The company was responsible for 11 bus lines between 1861 and 1865.

Few years later the first horse-drawn trams were introduced: 3 lines were opened in 1881 followed in 1893 by the first electric tramway, built by Edison company. Two years later the same company opened 18 more lines, all ruled by municipality offices. Edison's concession on new lines expired in 1917, leaving all the operations to the municipality. Few years later the public offices responsible for public transport operations were made independent, becoming the Azienda Tranviaria Municipale (ATM) in 1931.

In the meantime, the first petrol powered bus lines were introduced in 1905, operated by SITA (Società Italiana Trasporto con Automobili) and then moved under control of ATM along with the first trolleybus line (1933).

After World War II resources were focused on bus lines and, since the mid-1950s, on the new metro. Milan Metro construction began in 1957 and in 1964 the first line was opened. Five years later the Line 2 was inaugurated.

On 1 January 1965, ATM changed its name to "Azienda Trasporti Municipali" (Municipal Transport Company). In these years a new generation of longer tram (jumbotram) were introduced. In the 1960s Italy and Milan saw a strong increase in car owners, and the increasing importance of private over public transport.

Several new stations of the two metro lines are opened in the following years. The new Line 3 was inaugurated in 1990.

Tram line 15 to Rozzano was the first to go beyond the city border in 1992.

ATM changed its name again in 1999 to adopt the current one, "Azienda Trasporti Milanesi", and it became a S.p.a. in 2001.  In these years, the first on-demand service, the Radiobus, was introduced to operate during the night.

The first light rail line, Line 7, was introduced on 7 December 2002. This was followed by other two lines on 8 December 2003: Line 4 and Line 15. These three lines are howsoever referred to as trams.

New magnetic tickets and electronic pass cards were introduced in 2004. The complete upgrade process took 3 years.

Network

Rapid transit

The Milan rapid transit network consists of 5 lines:
 M1 Sesto I Maggio - Rho Fiera / Bisceglie
 M2 Assago Milanofiori Forum / Abbiategrasso - Cologno Nord / Gessate
 M3 San Donato - Comasina
 M4 Linate Aeroporto - Dateo
 M5 San Siro Stadio - Bignami
The system has a daily ridership of over 1 million and is the biggest in Italy.

Outside of Italy, ATM also operates the Copenhagen Metro.

People mover

ATM operates a single people mover line, MeLA, that connects the Milan Metro with San Raffaele Hospital.

Trams

The tram network comprises 15 lines fully within the city limits (1, 2, 3, 4, 5, 7, 9, 10, 12, 14, 16, 19, 24, 27, 33), plus two lines linking the city centre with the hinterland (15 Milan-Rozzano, 31 Milan-Cinisello Balsamo).
Lines 1, 5, 10, 19 and 33 are operated with Peter Witt streetcars from the 1920s.

Trolleybuses

The trolleybus network consists of 4 lines: lines 90 and 91 (known as la circolare, "Circle line") run around the city, while lines 92 and 93 serve some of the northern and eastern neighbourhoods.

Buses

ATM operates 68 urban bus lines and 53 interurban bus lines.

See also
Transport in Milan
Integrated ticketing in Lombardy

Notes and references 

Transport companies of Italy
Transport in Milan
Public transport in Italy
Metropolitan City of Milan
Companies based in Milan
Transport companies established in 1931
Italian companies established in 1931